Arnaud Ayax (born 27 June 1986) is a French former football 5-a-side player who competed at international football 5-a-side competitions. He is a Paralympic silver medalist and a two-time European champion. He was born with retinitis pigmentosa and has been blind since birth.

References

External links
 
 

1986 births
Living people
People from Longjumeau
French footballers
Paralympic 5-a-side footballers of France
5-a-side footballers at the 2012 Summer Paralympics
Medalists at the 2012 Summer Paralympics
Paralympic silver medalists for France
Sportspeople from Essonne
21st-century French people
French blind people